The eighth season of the American television comedy series How I Met Your Mother was announced in March 2011 along with confirmation of the seventh season. The season premiered on September 24, 2012 and concluded on May 13, 2013.

In addition to the Region 1 DVD release of the season on October 1, 2013, it was also added on Netflix for streaming in the same day.

Cast

Main cast
 Josh Radnor as Ted Mosby
 Jason Segel as Marshall Eriksen
 Cobie Smulders as Robin Scherbatsky
 Neil Patrick Harris as Barney Stinson
 Alyson Hannigan as Lily Aldrin
 Bob Saget as future Ted Mosby (voice only) (uncredited)

Recurring cast

 Michael Trucco as Nick Podarutti
 Ashley Williams as Victoria
 Ellen D. Williams as Patrice, Robin's coworker
 Lyndsy Fonseca as Penny, Ted's future daughter
 David Henrie as Luke, Ted's future son
 Chris Elliott as Mickey Aldrin
 Becki Newton as Quinn
 Abby Elliott as Jeanette Peterson
 Kyle MacLachlan as The Captain
 Thomas Lennon as Klaus
 Joe Manganiello as Brad Morris
 Ray Wise as Robin Scherbatsky, Sr.
 Suzie Plakson as Judy Eriksen
 Marshall Manesh as Ranjit

Guest stars
 Geddy Lee as himself
 Steven Page as himself
 Rachel Bilson as Cindy
 Ashley Benson as Carly Whittaker
 Laura Bell Bundy as Becky
 Bill Fagerbakke as Marvin Eriksen, Sr.
 David Burtka as Scooter
 Frances Conroy as Loretta Stinson
 Alexis Denisof as Sandy Rivers
 Alex Trebek as himself
 James Van Der Beek as Simon Tremblay
 Peter Gallagher as Professor Vinnick
 Mike Tyson as himself
 Seth Green as Daryl LaCourte
 Joe Lo Truglio as Honeywell
 Ralph Macchio as himself
 William Zabka as Clown/Himself
 Dave Coulier as himself
 k.d. lang as herself
 Jayma Mays as the Coat-Check Girl
 Keegan-Michael Key as Calvin
 Casey Wilson as Krirsten
 Cristin Milioti as Tracy McConnell, The Mother
 Alan Thicke as himself
 Jason Priestley as himself

Episodes

<onlyinclude>{{Episode table |background=#80DAEB |overall=5 |season=5 |title=24 |director=12 |writer=22 |airdate=14 |prodcode=8 |viewers=10 |country=US |episodes=

{{Episode list/sublist|How I Met Your Mother (season 8)
 |EpisodeNumber   = 165
 |EpisodeNumber2  = 5
 |Title           = The Autumn of Break-Ups
 |RTitle          =
 |DirectedBy      = Pamela Fryman
 |WrittenBy       = Kourtney Kang
 |OriginalAirDate = 
 |ProdCode        = 8ALH06
 |Viewers         = 7.22<ref name="s08e05">{{cite web | url=http://tvbythenumbers.zap2it.com/2012/11/06/monday-final-ratings-2-broke-girls-no-adjustment-for-the-mob-doctor-90210-or-the-voice/156346/ | title=Monday Final Ratings: '2 Broke Girls', & 'Revolution' Adjusted Down; No Adjustment for 'The Mob Doctor', '90210 or 'The Voice' | publisher=TV By the Numbers | access-date=November 6, 2012 | url-status=dead | archive-url=https://web.archive.org/web/20121108133009/http://tvbythenumbers.zap2it.com/2012/11/06/monday-final-ratings-2-broke-girls-no-adjustment-for-the-mob-doctor-90210-or-the-voice/156346/ | archive-date=November 8, 2012 | df=mdy-all }}</ref>
 |ShortSummary    = As the season of break-ups continues, Ted and Victoria decide to end their relationship. Meanwhile, Barney uses a dog as his wingman which worries Robin.
 |LineColor       = 80DAEB
}}

 

}}</onlyinclude>

Reception
The eighth season of How I Met Your Mother received generally mixed reactions. The review aggregation site Rotten Tomatoes reported that 54% of critics gave it a positive review. The consensus reads: "How I Met Your Mother wears out its welcome this season, with an anticlimactic reveal and rote, less-than-fruitful humor."

Alexander Lowe of We Got This Covered gave the season a negative review, saying: "After 8 long years and 192 episodes of How I Met Your Mother, the future Mrs. Ted Mosby has finally been revealed. And it was dreadfully anticlimactic". He gave the season as a whole a 5/10. Matt Roush of TV Guide also gave the season a negative review, writing: "I find it hard not to stifle a yawn. Move on, show, and please give serious thought to wrapping things up this season while we might still care."

While the majority of the reviews were mixed, some were positive, with Donna Bowman from The A.V. Club'' giving the season a "B" grade.

Ratings

References

External links

 

8
2012 American television seasons
2013 American television seasons